"The Killers" is a short story by Ernest Hemingway, published in Scribner's Magazine in 1927. After its appearance in Scribner's, the story was published in Men Without Women, Snows of Kilimanjaro, and The Nick Adams Stories. The writer's depiction of the human experience, his use of satire, and the everlasting themes of death, friendship, and the purpose of life have contributed to make "The Killers" one of Hemingway's most famous and frequently anthologized short stories.

The story features Nick Adams, a famous Hemingway character from his short stories. In this story, Hemingway shows Adams crossing over from teenager to adult. The basic plot of the story involves two hitmen who enter a restaurant seeking to kill a boxer, a Swede named Ole Andreson, who is hiding out for reasons unknown, possibly for winning a fight.

Historians have some documents showing that the working title of the piece was "The Matadors".

How much Hemingway received for the literary piece is unknown, but some sources state it was $200.

Summary
The story takes place in Summit, Illinois, during the 1920s, during Prohibition. Two hitmen, Max and Al, dressed as twins walk into Henry's lunch-room, which is run by George. They order pork chops and chicken dinners that are not yet available and settle for ham and eggs and bacon and eggs. Also in the lunch-room is Nick Adams who is a recurring character in Hemingway's stories. Al takes Nick into the kitchen and ties up him and Sam the cook. Max and George soon have a conversation, which reveals that the two men are there to kill Ole Andreson, a Swedish ex-heavyweight prizefighter, for a "friend." Andreson never shows, so the two men leave. George sends Nick to Hirsch's boarding house, run by Mrs. Bell, to warn Andreson about the two men. Nick finds Andreson lying in his bed with all of his clothes on.  He tells Andreson what has happened. Andreson does not react, except to tell Nick not to do anything, as there is nothing that can be done. Nick leaves, goes back to the lunch-room, and informs George about Ole Andreson's reaction. When George no longer seems concerned, Nick decides to leave town.

Historical context
"The Killers" was written in the 1920s, when organized crime was at its peak during Prohibition. Chicago was the home of Al Capone, and  Hemingway himself spent time in Chicago as a young man. When things became too dangerous for the mob, they retreated to the suburb of Summit, where "The Killers" takes place. Not long before the story was written, the Chicago mob had ordered the killing of a popular boxer of the time, Andre Anderson. Leo Mongoven went on the run after the killing in 1926 and was captured following a road accident which claimed the life of Chicago banker John J Mitchell and his wife in 1927 - Hemingway was probably unaware of the accident as his short story went into print. Anderson once knocked Jack Dempsey off his feet, likely Hemingway's source for the Swede.

Despite Hemingway's knowledge of organized crime, he omitted much of that background from the story. Hemingway himself said, "That story probably had more left out of it than anything I ever wrote.  I left out all Chicago, which is hard to do in 2951 words."

In 1984,  Oak Park and River Forest High School published the anthology Hemingway at Oak Park High and included short works that Hemingway had written for his school newspaper and literary magazine. One of the stories, "A Matter of Colour", involves the plot of a boxing manager's having a man named Swede hide behind a curtain and hit an opponent during a bout. The Swede fails, and the reader is left with an impression that in retaliation, the boxing manager puts out a contract on his life.

Adaptations
The short story has been the basis for several movies, and stories by Jorge Luis Borges and Tobias Wolff:
 The Killers (1946), starring Burt Lancaster and Ava Gardner
 The Killers (1956), a short film directed by Andrei Tarkovsky, Aleksandr Gordon and Marika Beiku
 The Killers (1959 television) starring Ingemar Johansson, Dean Stockwell, and Diane Baker on CBS's Buick-Electra Playhouse, televised on November 19, 1959.
 The Killers (1964), starring Lee Marvin, Ronald Reagan, and Angie Dickinson
 Carnal Circuit (Original Italian title: Femmine insaziabili) (1969), an unofficial adaptation as a giallo.
 "The Wait" ("La espera" in Spanish) (1950), a short story by Jorge Luis Borges that retells and reinterprets the meaning of this Hemingway story
 "Bullet in the Brain" (1995), a short story by Tobias Wolff
 "The Killers in the Diner", the fourth episode of Lupin the 3rd Part 6 (2021), features a retelling of "The Killers" as the cast searches for a rare printing of the short story.

See also
Pulp Fiction

References

External links
 
 
 

Short stories by Ernest Hemingway
1927 short stories
Works originally published in Scribner's Magazine
Short stories adapted into films
Autobiographical short stories